Makumira University College (MUCo) is the oldest constituent college of Tumaini University, located in the small town of Makumira, Poli ward, Arusha Region, Tanzania.

External links 

Buildings and structures in Arusha
Universities in Tanzania